The 2018 Teen Choice Awards ceremony was held on August 12, 2018, at the Forum in Inglewood, California. The awards celebrated the year's achievements in music, film, television, sports, fashion, comedy, and the internet, and are voted on by viewers aged 13 and over living in the United States through various social media sites.

The biggest winner of the night was Riverdale, earning nine of its twelve nominations, including Choice Drama Series for the second year running, and only losing to itself in categories where it was nominated twice. The Greatest Showman also won big, earning five of its nine nods including Choice Drama Movie and Choice Movie Drama Actor, won by Zac Efron.

Performers

Winners and nominees
The first wave of nominations were announced on June 13, 2018. The second wave was announced on June 22, 2018. Winners are listed first, in bold.

Movies

Television

Movies and television

Music

Digital

Fashion

Sports

Miscellaneous

References

2018
2018 awards in the United States
2018 in Los Angeles
August 2018 events in the United States
2018 film awards
2018 television awards
2018 music awards